Danny Olsen (born 11 June 1985) is a retired Danish professional footballer. He is the twin brother of the current Herlev IF assistant coach, Kenni Olsen.

References

External links
 
 Danny Olsen on DBU
 Official Danish Superliga stats

1985 births
Living people
Danish twins
Danish men's footballers
Denmark youth international footballers
Denmark under-21 international footballers
Hvidovre IF players
FC Nordsjælland players
FC Midtjylland players
Aarhus Gymnastikforening players
Hobro IK players
Danish Superliga players
Danish 1st Division players
Twin sportspeople
Association football midfielders
People from Hvidovre Municipality
Sportspeople from the Capital Region of Denmark